Nature Cat is an educational animated children's television series that premiered on November 25, 2015 on PBS Kids and is aimed at children aged 3–8. The series follows the adventures of four main characters: Nature Cat, Hal the Dog, Squeeks the Mouse, and Daisy the Bunny. The show has been nominated for a Daytime Emmy Award for "Outstanding Writing in an Animated Program". The series debut in November achieved nearly 3.7 million viewers, and by March it has achieved 69 million video streams across online platforms. As of October 2016, Nature Cat has been renewed for a second and third season. The second season premiered on January 1, 2018. Then the third season premiered on April 18, 2019. In 2021, the show was renewed for a fourth and fifth season. The fourth season premiered on May 9, 2022, with the fifth season set to premiere on April 17, 2023.

The show's soundtrack, The Green Album, was released on February 16, 2018 through BMG Rights Management (which also owns the song publishing rights to Nature Cat).

On June 5, 2018, the first DVD Onward and Pondward was released. Tomy owns the toy license to Nature Cat, and has released several stuffed animals of the main characters.

Overview
The series takes place in the suburban areas of Chicago, Illinois, following Fred, a yellow house cat with dreams of exploring outside. Once his human owners leave for the day from 6:00 AM to 9:00 PM, he transforms into Nature Cat, who cannot wait for backyard nature excursions. However, Fred has one problem: he has no instincts for nature. Through the learning experiences of the characters, this series intends to encourage children to similarly engage with and develop understanding of nature.

Episodes

Characters

Main
Many primary cast members are better known for their work on the hit NBC comedy sketch show, Saturday Night Live.

 Nature Cat (a.k.a. Fred) (voiced by Taran Killam) - In the absence of his owners, Fred transforms into his alter-ego Nature Cat, narrating himself as such throughout the show. He is the main protagonist in leading a group of three other animals, frequently using the expressions "tally ho!" and "onward and yonward!" when initiating and continuing his adventures, lending to his optimistic and cheerful attitude in encouraging enthusiasm for the natural world. Actor and comedian Taran Killam appraises Nature Cat as a positive character for children, describing his handling of adversity as “a great example of when you fall down you get back right up… and try it again”. He will occasionally drop from his ‘Nature Cat’ persona where, much like a regular housecat, he can suddenly become nervous or frightened. This can include having to interact with water, lamenting “why did it have to be water?”, but in these situations he ultimately ends up finding confidence to persist. When Fred turns into Nature Cat his clothes are all green.
 Halbert "Hal" Alexandra the Dog (voiced by Bobby Moynihan seasons 1-4 and later Johnny Yong Bosch season 5 presentref name=Cast />) - Characterised as being happy most of the time and very loyal to his friends, most of all for Nature Cat. He is always willing to partake in Nature Cat's outdoor excursions and share discoveries even if he initially doesn't understand them. Hal is generally absent minded, becoming a source of comic relief where he may respond to others with non-sequiturs or muddled reasoning thought out loud. He can also become blissfully unaware of when he is taken into a dangerous situation, such as becoming lost in the city of Chicago, Illinois. His capabilities as a playful dog is portrayed as him being a character that is uninhibited in approaching messy or unpleasant situations, such as digging in the ground or smelling strong odors. This comes much to the benefit of others, where he is utilized in digging holes or locating in the environment by smell. He is sometimes accompanied by an inanimate chewing toy, “Mr. Chewinsky,” who he converses with when projecting his thoughts.
 Squeeks the Mouse (voiced by Kate McKinnon) - The smallest of the main four characters - actress and comedian, Kate McKinnon describes her as “a sass… but sweet and so excited at the same time”. At times, Squeeks can act tomboyish and sassy while on adventures, but nevertheless, she stays focused at the task at hand. Just because she is the smallest, doesn’t stop her from being a daring, fearless nature explorer. She’s a reliable mouse who is always up for adventure and isn’t afraid to get dirty. She has been shown to be the strongest of the group because of her ability to carry Hal. She also knows a lot of animals that are always eager to help out.
 Daisy the Bunny (voiced by Kate Micucci) - She is often carrying a smartphone for use in providing supplementary information when investigating nature. Her role is to act as the voice of reason, but nevertheless, she's mostly co-operative as the rest when venturing with Nature Cat.
 Ronald the Cat (voiced by Kenan Thompson (season 1), Chris Knowings (season 2-present)) - The main antagonist of the series. Ronald lives in the backyard next door and is Nature Cat's nemesis. He is arrogant, vain (often specifically obsessed with grooming his hair) and fairly obnoxious. He also tries to compete against Nature Cat.

Others
 Chris Parnell as Sir Galahad, The Announcer, Houston, additional voices
 David Rudman as Leo the Mammoth, additional voices
 Stephanie D'Abruzzo as Alice the Butterfly, additional voices
 Bobby Lee as MC Ferret
 Kate Micucci as Granny Bunny
 James Monroe Iglehart as Michael Bluejay (a takeoff on Michael Buble)
 Leslie Carrara-Rudolph as Gracie the Toad, Sadie Dog, Rat, additional voices
 Joey Rudman as Jimmy Cat, Jingles, Steve Vole, additional voices
 Joey Mazzarino
 Fred Armisen as Herbert the Hermit Crab, additional voices
 Rachel Dratch as Flo the Heron, Lulu Ladybug
 Cobie Smulders as Nature Dog
 Dennis Singletary
 Tom Blandford
 Richard Traub
 Lauren Lapkus as Lola the Flamingo
 Chris Jackson
 Cecily Strong as Petunia Bunny, additional voices
 Lena Hall and Tony Vincent provide the vocals for "Dog Gone" (during interlude segments and two episodes (currently))
 Emily Lynne as One Eared Winnie (a.k.a. Gwendolyn), Nature Cat's long-lost twin sister; additional voices
 Jeanne Fishman as Kathy, a spiny lobster.
 Jack Shulruff 
 Crystal Monee Hall, Marcus Paul James, and Kristina Nicole Miller as an off-screen chorus for the song "Can You Dig It?!"
 Erica Broder 
 Tyler Bunch as Twig Stickman, the host of the game show "So You Think You Know Nature?"; Johnny Spins, a radio DJ.
 Chris Kratt and Martin Kratt as Chris and Martin Batt
 Paul F. Tompkins as Chandler the Toad, additional voices
 Frankie Cordero
 Carmella Riley
 Reggie Miller

Broadcast 
The series premiered on PBS Kids on November 25, 2015 in the United States.

International broadcast 
The series aired on Family Jr. and Family CHRGD in Canada, Discovery Kids in Latin America, and TG4 in Ireland for Season 1. It is currently unknown when Season 2 and 3 will be airing internationally.

Discography

Albums 

 The Green Album (2018)

Singles 
 "Theme Song"
 "Clouds"

Fundings 
 The Van Eekeren Family, Founders of Land O' Frost (2015–present)
 Capri Sun, maker of Capri Sun Organic (2016–17)
 Aldi (2018–19)
 Boxed.com (2022)

References

External links
 

2010s American animated television series
2020s American animated television series
2015 American television series debuts
2010s Canadian animated television series
2020s Canadian animated television series
2015 Canadian television series debuts
American children's animated adventure television series
American children's animated comedy television series
American children's animated education television series
Canadian children's animated adventure television series
Canadian children's animated comedy television series
Canadian children's animated education television series
English-language television shows
Family Jr. original programming
PBS Kids shows
PBS original programming
Nature educational television series
Animated television series about cats
Television series by 9 Story Media Group
Television series by WTTW
Television shows set in Chicago